Caspar Memering (born 1 June 1953) is a German former professional footballer who played as a midfielder. He was part of the West Germany national team that won the 1980 UEFA European Championship.

Honours 
Hamburger SV
 Bundesliga: 1978–79, 1981–82
 DFB-Pokal: 1975–76
 UEFA Cup Winners' Cup: 1976–77
 European Cup: runner-up 1979–80
 UEFA Cup: runner-up 1981–82

West Germany
 UEFA European Championship: 1980

References

External links 
 

1953 births
Living people
German footballers
Association football midfielders
Germany international footballers
Germany B international footballers
UEFA Euro 1980 players
UEFA European Championship-winning players
West German footballers
Hamburger SV players
Bundesliga players
FC Girondins de Bordeaux players
Ligue 1 players
FC Schalke 04 players
West German expatriate footballers
West German expatriate sportspeople in France
Expatriate footballers in France